The Centre Party (Kesk), officially the Centre Party of Finland, is an agrarian political party in Finland.

Ideologically, the Centre Party is positioned in the centre on the political spectrum. It has been described as liberal, social liberal, liberal-conservative, and conservative-liberal. Its leader is Annika Saarikko, who was elected in September 2020 to follow Katri Kulmuni, the former finance minister of Finland. As of December 2019, the party has been a coalition partner in the Marin Cabinet, led by Prime Minister Sanna Marin of the Social Democratic Party (SDP).

Founded in 1906 as the Agrarian League, the party represented rural communities and supported decentralisation of political power from Helsinki. In the 1920s, the party emerged as the main rival to the SDP and Kyösti Kallio, the party's first prime minister, held the office four times between 1922 and 1937. After World War II, the party settled as one of the four major political parties in Finland, alongside the SPD, the National Coalition Party and the Finnish People's Democratic League until the 1980s. Urho Kekkonen served as President of Finland from 1956 to 1982, by far the longest period of any president. The name Centre Party was adopted in 1965 and Centre of Finland in 1988. The Centre Party was the largest party in Parliament from 2003 to 2011, during which time Matti Vanhanen was Prime Minister for seven years. By 2011, the party was reduced in parliamentary representation from the largest party to the fourth largest, but it reclaimed its status as the largest party in 2015. In 2019, it suffered a considerable defeat, losing 18 of 49 seats.

As a Nordic agrarian party, the Centre Party's political influence is greatest in small and rural municipalities, where it often holds a majority of the seats in the municipal councils. Decentralisation is the policy that is most characteristic of the Centre Party which has been the ruling party in Finland a number of times since Finnish independence. Twelve of the Prime Ministers of Finland, three of the Presidents and a former European Commissioner for Economic and Financial Affairs have been from the party.

History

Founding 

The party was founded in 1906 as a movement of citizens in the Finnish countryside. Before Finnish independence, political power in Finland was centralised in the capital and to the estates of the realm. The centralisation gave space for a new political movement. In 1906, two agrarian movements were founded. They merged in 1908 to become one political party known as the Agrarian League or Maalaisliitto. An older, related movement was the temperance movement which had overlapping membership and gave future to Agrarian League activists experience in working in an organisation.

Santeri Alkio's ideology 
Soon the ideas of humanity, education, the spirit of the land, peasant-like freedom, decentralisation, "the issue of poor people", progressivism and later the "green wave" became the main political phrases used to describe the ideology of the party. Santeri Alkio was the most important ideological father of the party.

Defending the republic 
At the dawn of Finnish independence, conservative social forces made an attempt to establish the Kingdom of Finland. The Agrarian League opposed monarchism fiercely, even though monarchists claimed that a new king from the German Empire and Hohenzollern would have safeguarded Finnish foreign relations. At this time, anti-anarchist peasants threatened the existence of the party.

Because around forty Social Democratic members of the Parliament had escaped to Russia after the Finnish Civil War and about fifty others had been arrested, the Agrarian League members of the Parliament became the only republicans in Parliament in 1918. Nevertheless, the news about the problems of the German Empire from German liberals encouraged the fight of Agrarian League in the Parliament.

The Agrarian League managed to maintain the republican voices in the Parliament until the fall of the German Empire which ruined the dreams of the monarchists. The relentless opposition to the monarchy was rewarded in the 1919 Finnish parliamentary election and the party became the biggest non-socialist party in Finland with 19.7% of the votes.

Post-war period 
After the 1919 Finnish parliamentary election, the centrist and progressive forces, including the Agrarian League, were constant members in Finnish governments. Their moderate attitude in restless post-war Finland secured a steady growth in following elections. The party formed many centrist minority governments with National Progressive Party and got its first Prime Ministers (Kyösti Kallio in 1922 and Juho Sunila in 1927).

Conciliation between the left and the right 
For the Agrarian League, the centrist governments were just a transitional period towards an era which would integrate the red and white sides of the Civil War into one nation. Nevertheless, not everyone was happy with the conciliatory politics of centrist governments. The extreme right Lapua Movement grew bigger and bigger in the Agrarian League strongholds in the countryside. Many party members joined the new radical movement. The Lapua Movement organised assaults and kidnappings in Finland between 1929 and 1932. In 1930, after the kidnapping of progressive president Kaarlo Juho Ståhlberg, the Agrarian League broke off all its ties to the movement and got a new political enemy in the countryside, the Patriotic People's Movement (IKL) which was founded after the Lapua Movement was outlawed.

In the 1933 Finnish parliamentary election, the main campaign issues were the differing attitudes towards democracy and the rule of law between the Patriotic Electoral Alliance (the National Coalition Party and the Patriotic People's Movement) and the Legality Front (the Social Democrats, the Agrarian League, the Swedish People's Party and the Progressives). The Patriotic Electoral Alliance favoured continuing the search for suspected communists, the Communist Party and its affiliated organisations in the spirit of the Lapua Movement. The Legality Front did not want to spend any significant time on searching suspected communists but rather wanted to concentrate on keeping the far-right in check. The Legality Front won the elections, but the Agrarian League lost a part of its support.

Cooperation with the Social Democrats 

Because of fierce opposition of the president Pehr Evind Svinhufvud, the Social Democrats remained outside the government and the Agrarian League was part of the centre-right governments until 1937. In the 1937 Finnish presidential election, the Agrarian League candidate Kyösti Kallio was elected president with the votes of centrist (Agrarian and Progressive) and social-democratic coalition which wanted to ensure that President Svinhufvud would not be re-elected. The new president allowed the first centre-left government to be formed in Finland and a new era had begun.

World War II 
With the outbreak of the Winter War, a government of national unity was formed. President Kallio died shortly after the war.

Kekkonen, the centrist statesman 

In 1956, Urho Kekkonen, the candidate of the Agrarian League, was elected President of Finland after serving as Prime Minister several times and remained President until 1982. Kekkonen continued the active neutrality policy of his predecessor Juho Kusti Paasikivi, a doctrine which came to be known as the Paasikivi–Kekkonen line. Under it, Finland retained its independence while being able to trade with NATO members and those of the Warsaw Pact.

Pressure of populism 
Veikko Vennamo, a vocal Agrarian politician, ran into serious disagreement particularly with the then-Party Secretary of the Agrarian Party Arvo Korsimo, who was excluded from the parliamentary group. As a result, Vennamo immediately started building his own organisation in 1959 and founded a new party, the Finnish Rural Party (Suomen maaseudun puolue, SMP). Vennamo was a populist and became a critic of Kekkonen and political corruption within the old parties, particularly the Agrarian League. Although this party had some success, it was essentially tied to Veikko Vennamo's person. His son Pekka Vennamo was able to raise the party to new success and into government in 1983, but after this the Rural Party's support declined steadily and eventually the party went bankrupt in 1995. Immediately after this, the right-wing populist Finns Party (Perussuomalaiset) was founded by former members of SMP.

Transformation to the Centre Party 
In 1965, the party changed its name to the Centre Party (Keskustapuolue) and in 1988 took its current Centre Party of Finland name (Suomen Keskusta). Despite urbanisation of Finland and a temporary nadir in support, the party managed to continue to attract voters.

The Liberal People's Party (LKP) became a member party of the Centre Party in 1982.  The two separated again after the success of the Liberal People's Party in the 1985 Swedish general election.

Division over EU membership 

The Centre Party was a key player in making the decision to apply for Finnish EU membership in 1992. As the leading governing party, its support for the application was crucial. The party itself, both leadership and supporters, was far from united on the issue. In the Parliament, 22 out of 55 Centre MPs voted against the application. In June 1994, the party congress decided to support EU membership (by 1607 votes to 834), but only after the Prime Minister and Party Chairman Esko Aho threatened to resign if the party were to oppose the membership.

The centrist tradition of defending equal political and economic rights for peripheral areas was reflected in the internal resistance that opposed chairman Aho's ambitions to lead Finland to the EU. The Centre Party was in opposition from 1995 to 2003 and opposed adopting the euro as Finland's currency. However, the party accepted the euro after regaining power in 2003.

2012 and beyond 
The party congress in June 2012 elected the newcomer Juha Sipilä to replace Mari Kiviniemi as the party's chair. Sipilä defeated young deputy chairman Tuomo Puumala and a well known veteran politician Paavo Väyrynen in the voting.

The previous chairman Mari Kiviniemi succeeded Matti Vanhanen as Prime Minister in 2010, serving in the office for one year. At the time, she was the third Centre Party Prime Minister of Finland in succession. Anneli Jäätteenmäki preceded Vanhanen and she was the first woman as a Prime Minister of Finland. She did not seek another term as party chair.

Olli Rehn, a member of the party, served in the European Commission for ten years between 2004 and 2014 and was the European Commissioner for Economic and Financial Affairs from 2010 to 2014.

The Centre Party was the biggest loser of the 2011 Finnish parliamentary election, losing 16 seats and going from largest party to fourth place. The party's support was lower than in any parliamentary election since 1917. However, the party won the 2015 Finnish parliamentary election and formed a coalition with the Finns Party and the National Coalition Party.

In March 2016, the Centre Party announced that its candidate for the 2018 Finnish presidential election would be the former Prime Minister Matti Vanhanen, the first declared presidential candidate in the race.

The Centre Party was again the biggest loser in the 2019 Finnish parliamentary election, losing 18 seats and going from largest party to fourth place. The party's support was even lower than in 2011. Due to the devastating defeat, Sipilä consequently announced that he would continue as the chairman only until the Centre Party's next convention in September 2019. The party congress in September 2019 elected the Minister of Economic Affairs Katri Kulmuni to replace Sipilä as the party's chair.

On 5 September 2020, during a party congress, Annika Saarikko was elected as the leader of the Centre Party to replace Katri Kulmuni.

During late 2022, The Centre Party was polling at its lowest record in support in polls with less than 10% support.

Ideology 

The ideology of the party is unusual in the European context. Unlike many other large parties in Europe, its ideology is not primarily based on economic systems. Rather, the ideas of humanity, education, the spirit of the land, peasant-like freedom, decentralisation, "the issue of poor people", environmentalism and progressivism play a key role in Centre Party politician speeches and writings. From the very beginning of its presence, the party has supported the idea of decentralisation.

Despite belonging to the Liberal International, the Centre Party does not play quite the same role in Finnish politics as do liberal parties in other countries because the party evolved from agrarian roots.

The party has a more conservative wing, and prominent conservatives within the party such as Paavo Väyrynen have criticised overt economic and cultural liberalism. In addition, the 2010 party congress voted to oppose same-sex marriage. When the Finnish Parliament voted on same-sex marriage in 2014, 30 of the 36 Centre MPs voted against it.

The party is also divided on the issue of deepening European integration and contains a notable Eurosceptic faction based on its more rural interests. The party expressly rejects a federal Europe. The Centre Party was originally opposed to Finland's membership in the euro currency, but the party later stated that it would not seek to withdraw from the Economic and Monetary Union once Finland had entered.

In Finland, there is no large party that supports liberalism per se. Instead, liberalism is found in most major parties including the Centre Party which supports decentralisation, free will, free and fair trade and small enterprise. The Centre Party characteristically supports decentralisation, particularly decreasing the central power, increasing the power of municipalities and populating the country evenly. During the party's premierships between 2003 and 2011, these policies were also manifested as transferrals of certain government agencies from the capital to smaller cities in the regions.

Throughout the period of Finland's independence, the Centre Party has been the party most often represented in the government. The country's longest-serving President, Urho Kekkonen, was a member of the party as were two other Presidents.

Today, only a small portion of the votes given to the party come from farmers and the Centre Party draws support from a wide range of professions. However, even today rural Finland and small towns form the strongest base of support for the party, although it has strived for a breakthrough in the major southern cities as well. In the 2011 Finnish parliamentary election, the party received only 4.5 per cent of votes cast in the capital Helsinki, compared to the 33.4 per cent in the largely rural electoral district of Oulu.

Organisation

Party structure 
In the organisation of the Centre Party, local associations dominate the election of party leaders, the selection of local candidates and drafting of policy. The headquarters in Apollonkatu, Helsinki leads financing and organisation of elections.

The party has 2.500 local associations which have 160.000 individual members. The local associations elect their representatives to the party congress which elects the party leadership and decide on policy. The local associations form also 21 regional organisations which have also their representatives in the party congress.

The party congress is the highest decision-making body of the party. It elects the chairman, three deputy chairmen, the secretary-general and the party council.

The party council with 135 members is the main decision-making body between the party congresses. The party council elects the party government (excluding the leaders elected by the party congress) and the working committee. The party council, the party government and the Working Committee must have at least 40% representation of both sexes.

People

Chairman 
 Annika Saarikko (born 1983)

Deputy chairmen 
 Petri Honkonen (born 1987), Member of the Parliament
 Markus Lohi (born 1972), Member of the Parliament
 Riikka Manner (born 1981)

Party secretary 
 Riikka Pirkkalainen (born 1979)

Chairman of the parliamentary group 
 Antti Kurvinen (born 1986)

Deputy chairmen of the parliamentary group 
 Eeva Kalli (born 1981)
 Hanna-Leena Mattila (born 1968)

Other famous Centre Party politicians today

International Representation 
The party is a member of the Liberal International and the Alliance of Liberals and Democrats for Europe Party and subscribes to the liberal manifestos of these organisations. The Centre Party has been a full member of the Liberal International since 1988, having first joined as an observer member in 1983.

In the European Parliament, the Center Party sits in the Renew Europe group with 2 MEPs.

In the European Committee of the Regions, the Center Party sits in the Renew Europe CoR group with one full and two alternate members for the 2020-2025 mandate. Mirja Vehkapera is Deputy Coordinator in the COTER Commission.

Prominent party leaders

List of party presidents

Election results

Parliament of Finland

Municipal

European Parliament

Presidential elections

Indirect elections

Direct elections

See also 
 Liberalism and centrism in Finland
 Nordic agrarian parties

Notes

Sources

References

External links 

 
 Centre Party: Swedish-speaking section 
 Website in English 
 Youth organisations official website 

Centre Party (Finland)
1906 establishments in Finland